Adcatomus is a genus of South American huntsman spiders that was first described by Ferdinand Anton Franz Karsch in 1880.  it contains two species, found in Peru and Venezuela: A. ciudadus and A. flavovittatus.

See also
 List of Sparassidae species

References

Araneomorphae genera
Sparassidae
Spiders of South America